The Pomeranian culture, also Pomeranian or Pomerelian Face Urn culture was an Iron Age culture with origins in parts of the area south of the Baltic Sea (which later became Pomerania, part of northern Germany/Poland), from the 7th century BC to the 3rd century BC, which eventually covered most of today's Poland.

About 650 BC, it evolved from the Lusatian culture between the lower Vistula and Parseta rivers, and subsequently expanded southward. Between 200 and 150 BC, it was succeeded by the Oksywie culture in eastern Pomerania and the Przeworsk culture at the upper Vistula and Oder rivers.

Features

The Pomeranian culture developed in Western Pomerania covering the entire range of the Oder (Odra) and Vistula river basins. It has been sometimes associated with the Bastarnae. The original homeland of the Bastarnae remains uncertain. Babeş and Shchukin argue in favour of an origin in eastern Pomerania on the Baltic coast of northwestern Poland, on the grounds of correspondences in archaeological material e.g. a Pomeranian-style fibula found in a Poieneşti site in Moldavia.

The most characteristic feature was the use of burial urns with faces. The urns were often contained in stone cists. The face-urns have lids in the form of hats, often miniature ear-rings of real bronze are added. The faces are sometimes modelled very naturalistically, and no two urns show the same face. Incised drawings on the urns show hunting scenes, chariot races, or riders. Brooches of Certoza-type and necklaces of multiple bronze rings are typical examples of metal work.

The economy was similar to that of the Lusatian culture. Rye was systematically cultivated for the first time, but still formed a minor component of the cereals. There were fewer hill forts than in the area of the Lusatian culture further west. Southern imports were sparse as well.

Related cultures

A related culture of the same age was the House Urn culture in central Germany.

Spread

In the later Iron Age, the Pomeranian culture spread southward, into areas formerly belonging to the Lusatian, Wysoko- and Milograd cultures. In Masovia and Poland, this mixture led to the development of the group with bell-shaped burials.

Gallery

See also
 Bronze- and Iron-Age Poland
 Lusatian culture
 Przeworsk culture
 Nordic Bronze Age

References

External links

Late Bronze and early Iron Age costumes in the Southern Baltic (2017)

Archaeological cultures of Central Europe
Archaeological cultures of Eastern Europe
Iron Age cultures of Europe
Slavic archaeological cultures
Archaeological cultures in Belarus
Archaeological cultures in Poland
Archaeological cultures in Ukraine
Prehistoric Poland
History of Pomerania